Jeyd is a village in Minabad Rural District, Anbaran District, Namin County, Ardabil Province, Iran. At the 2006 census, the population was 1,015, in 232 families.

References 

Towns and villages in Namin County